Zblewo  is a village in Starogard County, Pomeranian Voivodeship, in northern Poland. It is the seat of the gmina (administrative district) called Gmina Zblewo. It is located within the ethnocultural region of Kociewie in the historic region of Pomerania.

The village has a population of 3,615.

History

Zblewo was a royal village of the Polish Crown, administratively located in the Tczew County in the Pomeranian Voivodeship.

During the German occupation of Poland (World War II), in 1939, the Germans murdered several Poles from Zblewo, including a local priest, along with Poles from other villages in large massacres in the Szpęgawski Forest (see Intelligenzaktion).

Notable people
Józef Wrycza (1884–1961), Polish Catholic priest, pro-independence activist, member of the Polish resistance movement in World War II
 (1963–2019), Polish actress

References

Zblewo
Pomeranian Voivodeship (1919–1939)